James Graham (January 8, 1865 – February 17, 1935) was an American Major League Baseball third baseman. He played for the Philadelphia Athletics of the American Association in four games during the 1889 season. He also played in the minor leagues from 1889 to 1897.

External links

1865 births
1935 deaths
19th-century baseball players
Major League Baseball third basemen
Philadelphia Athletics (AA) players
Atlanta Firecrackers players
Minneapolis Minnies players
York White Roses players
Hazleton Barons players
Indianapolis Hoosiers (minor league) players
Hazleton Quay-kers players
Philadelphia Athletics (minor league) players
Lancaster Maroons players
Baseball players from Philadelphia